The State Training School Historic District, partly within the limits of Mandan, North Dakota included work dating to 1924.  It was also known as the North Dakota State Reform School.  It was located within the main campus of the North Dakota State Industrial School.

It was listed on the National Register of Historic Places in 1996. It was delisted in 2018.

References

School buildings on the National Register of Historic Places in North Dakota
Gothic Revival architecture in North Dakota
Mission Revival architecture in North Dakota
Historic districts on the National Register of Historic Places in North Dakota
National Register of Historic Places in Morton County, North Dakota
Schools in Morton County, North Dakota
Mandan, North Dakota